Amusing the Amazing is an EP by American stoner rock band Slo Burn, released in 1997. It contains four songs, and sounds very much in the vein of Kyuss, of stoner rock fame, partly due to having been co-produced by Chris Goss, who also produced much of the music of Kyuss, and partly due to the presence of John Garcia, formerly of Kyuss, on vocals.

Track listing

Later unofficial releases of this EP had added tracks from their earlier five track demo. The quality of these extra tracks is inferior to the normal EP. These tracks are:

Notes
 "Cactus Jumper" has since been re-recorded and was officially released on John Garcia's 2014 solo album as "All These Walls".

Personnel
 John Garcia – vocals
 Chris Hale – guitars
 Damon Garrison – bass guitar
 Brady Houghton – drums

Credits
 Chris Goss – producer
 Slo Burn – producer
 Martin Schmelzle – engineer
 Ralph Cacciurri – assistant engineer
 Greg Fiddlman – assistant engineer
 Kevin Estrada – band photographer
 All songs by Slo Burn

References

1996 EPs
Slo Burn albums